The 2011 NAIA Division I women's basketball tournament was the tournament held by the NAIA to determine the national champion of women's college basketball among its Division I members in the United States and Canada for the 2010–11 basketball season.

In a rematch of the 2010 final, Azusa Pacific defeated two-time defending champions Union (TN) in the championship game, 65–59, to claim the Cougars' first NAIA national title.

The tournament was played at the Oman Arena in Jackson, Tennessee. This was the last of twenty-two consecutive tournaments played in Jackson.

Qualification

The tournament field remained fixed at thirty-two teams, which were sorted into four quadrants of eight teams each. Within each quadrant, teams were seeded sequentially from one to eight based on record and season performance.

The tournament continued to utilize a simple single-elimination format.

Bracket

See also
2011 NAIA Division I men's basketball tournament
2011 NCAA Division I women's basketball tournament
2011 NCAA Division II women's basketball tournament
2011 NCAA Division III women's basketball tournament
2011 NAIA Division II women's basketball tournament

References

NAIA
NAIA Women's Basketball Championships
2011 in sports in Tennessee